Dermestes caninus is a species of carpet beetle in the family Dermestidae. It is found in North America and Oceania.

Subspecies
These three subspecies belong to the species Dermestes caninus:
 Dermestes caninus caninus Germar, 1824
 Dermestes caninus compactus Casey
 Dermestes caninus nubipennis Casey

References

Further reading

 
 

Dermestes
Articles created by Qbugbot
Beetles described in 1824